Arturo Ruíz Aguirre (born March 5, 1990, in Nuevo León) is a Mexican professional footballer who last played for Murciélagos F.C. He made his professional debut with Irapuato during a Copa MX defeat to Estudiantes de Altamira on 17 September 2014.

References

1990 births
Living people
Association football defenders
Bravos de Nuevo Laredo footballers
Unión de Curtidores footballers
Irapuato F.C. footballers
Murciélagos FC footballers
Ascenso MX players
Liga Premier de México players
Tercera División de México players
Footballers from Nuevo León
Sportspeople from Monterrey
Mexican footballers